The Coppertop Flop Show, also known as Coppertop Flop, is a series of television shorts which first aired on the Disney Channel on August 1, 2013. The series was created by Derek Baynham, Kelly May and Calum Worthy. Individual episodes are quick comedy sketches, less than 5 minutes in length. The final original short premiered on February 6, 2014.

Cast
Calum Worthy as himself

Special guests
Grant Linden as himself
Meaghan Martin as herself
Debby Ryan as herself
Allie Gonino as herself
John Paul Green as himself

Episodes
The following are the 22 episode shorts of The Coppertop Flop Show.

See also
 Brian O'Brian
 Mr. Bean

References

External links

Disney Channel original programming
2013 American television series debuts
2014 American television series endings